Jente Bouckaert (born 15 January 1990) is a Belgian athlete who competes in the sprint.

Bouckaert won the gold medal at the 2012 European Athletics Championships in Helsinki at the 4 × 400 metres relay.

See also
 Belgian men's 4 × 400 metres relay team

External links 
 

1990 births
Living people
Belgian male sprinters
European Athletics Championships medalists